Konstantina Benteli is a Greek weightlifter from Thessaloniki. She is the owner of 3 national records. She won one gold and one silver medal at the 2018 Mediterranean Games.

References

Greek athletes
Living people
1993 births
Mediterranean Games gold medalists for Greece
Mediterranean Games silver medalists for Greece
Mediterranean Games medalists in weightlifting
Competitors at the 2018 Mediterranean Games
Sportspeople from Thessaloniki
21st-century Greek women